Carlos Monje Serrano (born 6 June 1990), commonly known as Chirri is a Spanish footballer who plays for Mérida AD as a forward.

Club career
Born in Badajoz, Chirri arrived at the youth academy of Deportivo de La Coruña in 2006 from Mérida AD. He was promoted to the B-team in 2008. He scored his first goal for the club in the 85th minute of a 1–0 victory against Barakaldo CF.

On 19 July 2011, Chirri signed for CD Teruel but left after one season, when he moved to Arroyo. After representing Xerez and Cerceda in quick succession which played in Tercera División, he returned to the third tier with Lucena on 11 July 2014. His debut came on 24 August, when he featured in a 2–2 draw with Granada B.

On 16 January 2015, Chirri moved abroad and signed for Polish I liga club MKP Pogoń Siedlce. On 13 April, he scored his only goal for the club, netting the lone goal in a victory against Olimpia Grudziądz.

After having returned to Spain with CF Gavà in 2015, he switched to FC Jumilla after one season on 3 February 2016.

International career
Chirri was shortlisted by manager Miguel Ángel Lotina for a Spain U19 squad that would play in a friendly tournament in Ireland. In following year, he scored a goal for the under 19 team against Estonia U19.

Statistics

References

External links

1990 births
Living people
Association football forwards
Segunda División B players
Tercera División players
Deportivo Fabril players
CD Teruel footballers
Xerez CD footballers
Lucena CF players
CF Gavà players
SD Leioa players
I liga players
MKP Pogoń Siedlce players
FC Jumilla players
Mérida AD players
Spain youth international footballers
Spanish expatriate footballers
Expatriate footballers in Poland
Spanish expatriate sportspeople in Poland
Spanish footballers